This is a list of frogs and toads known to be found in New Jersey.

Frogs

Toads

References

Frogs and toads
New Jersey
.Amphibians
New Jersey